Como railway station may refer to:

Como railway station, Sydney, Australia
Como San Giovanni railway station, Italy